Nidderdale High School is a coeducational secondary school located in Pateley Bridge, North Yorkshire, England. The school is named after Nidderdale, one of the Yorkshire Dales in which the school is located.

It is a community school administered by North Yorkshire County Council, and offers GCSEs and Cambridge Nationals as programmes of study for pupils.

The school is part of the Red Kite Alliance – a partnership of schools and universities in Yorkshire focused on providing school-to-school support and training new teachers.

History 
In July 2017, a group of children from the school were runners-up in the Project Reinvent Challenge, sponsored by Drax Power and won a share of the £10 000 prize for their design for a new climbing wall.

In December 2017, the school received media attention after part-time art teacher Bridget Adams won The Royal Glasgow Institute of the Fine Arts Award for her artwork Organised Kindness.

In September 2020, the school won the National Association of Pastoral Care in Education Pastoral Development of the Year Award for its Harmony Project.

References

External links
Nidderdale High School official website

Secondary schools in North Yorkshire
Nidderdale
Community schools in North Yorkshire
Pateley Bridge